Broompark is a village in County Durham, England. It was once the site of the Broompark colliery, operated by North Brancepeth Coal company. The oldest remaining buildings in the village are Broom Farm guesthouse, built in 1711, and Broom Farm West, also built in the early 18th century. It was also the site of The Loves pub, which is now closed.

Villages in County Durham